Louis Menand (born January 21, 1952) is an American critic, essayist, and professor, best known for his Pulitzer-winning book The Metaphysical Club (2001), an intellectual and cultural history of late 19th and early 20th century America.

Life and career
Menand was born in Syracuse, New York, and raised around Boston, Massachusetts. His mother, Catherine (Shults) Menand, was a historian, who wrote a biography of Samuel Adams. His father, Louis Menand III, taught political science at the Massachusetts Institute of Technology.  His grandfather and great-grandfather owned the Louis Menand House, located in Menands, New York, and listed on the National Register of Historic Places in 1985. The village of Menands is named after his great-grandfather, a 19th-century horticulturalist.

A 1973 graduate of Pomona College, Menand attended Harvard Law School for one year (1973–1974) before he left to earn MA (1975) and PhD (1980) degrees in English from Columbia University.

He thereafter taught at Princeton University and held staff positions at The New York Review of Books (contributing editor 1994–2001) and The New Republic (associate editor 1986–1987). He has contributed to The New Yorker since 1991 and remains a staff writer. In 1988 he was appointed a Distinguished Professor of English at the Graduate Center of the City University of New York, and in 1990 he was awarded a Guggenheim Fellowship. He left CUNY to accept a post in the English Department at Harvard University in 2003. He has also taught at Columbia, Queens College, the University of Virginia School of Law.

He published his first book, Discovering Modernism: T. S. Eliot and His Context, in 1987.  His second book, The Metaphysical Club: A Story of Ideas in America (2001), includes detailed biographical material on Oliver Wendell Holmes, Jr., William James, Charles Sanders Peirce, and John Dewey, and documents their roles in the development of the philosophy of pragmatism. It received the 2002 Pulitzer Prize for History, the 2002 Francis Parkman Prize, and The Heartland Prize for Non-Fiction. In 2002 Menand published American Studies, a collection of essays on prominent figures in American culture.

He is the Anne T. and Robert M. Bass Professor of English at Harvard. In 2018 he was appointed for a 5-year term to the Lee Simpkins Family professorship of Arts and Sciences.  His principal field of academic interest is 19th and 20th century American cultural history. He teaches literary theory and postwar cultural history at both the graduate and undergraduate level.  At Harvard he helped co-found a freshman course with content in literature and philosophy, Humanities 10: An Introductory Humanities Colloquium. He also served as co-chair on the Task Force on General Education at Harvard working on a new general education curriculum.

In consultation with the National Endowment for the Humanities, President Barack Obama awarded him the National Humanities Medal in 2015.

Bibliography

Books

Essays and reporting
  Reviews 
 — (July 2, 2012). "Silence, Exile, Punning: James Joyce's chance encounters", pp. 71–75.
  Reviews 
 
  Reviews 
 
 
 
 
 
 
 
  Reviews Max Boot, The Road Not Taken: Edward Lansdale and the American Tragedy in Vietnam, Liveright / W.W. Norton & Co., 2018).
___ (September 30, 2019). “Merit Badges: Is higher education an engine of social injustice?” The Critics. Books. The New Yorker. (75-80). Reviews Tough, Paul, The Years That Matter Most. Houghton Mifflin Harcourt., Markovitz, Daniel, The Meritocracy Trap. Penguin.
 
 
 
———————
Notes

References

External links
 Louis Menand official website : recent articles, biography, books
 Harvard University Department of English faculty listing for Menand
 
 Menand's humorous exegesis of The Cat in the Hat on NPR's All Things Considered (link to Windows Media and RealMedia audio)
 Louis Menand on writing – (in the New Yorker)
 "Cat People: What Dr. Seuss really taught us" -(in the New Yorker)
 This Week in Media Rogues Article from The New York Observer about Louis Menand's review of "Wild Bill Donovan" in The New Yorker
 Letters to a Young Writer, Louis Menand to a letter, Narrative Magazine, (Fall 2010).
 Sun, Kevin, "Who is Louis Menand?", Harvard Crimson, October 20, 2011.

Interviews
 Louis Menand on Reforming U.S. Universities from NPR's All Things Considered (Air Date: 1/18/10)
 Menand interview on The Metaphysical Club on All Things Considered (link to WM and RM audio)
  in the Minnesota Review, (June 1, 2001).
 

1952 births
Living people
Pulitzer Prize for History winners
Harvard University faculty
Columbia Graduate School of Arts and Sciences alumni
Harvard Law School alumni
Princeton University faculty
Historians of the United States
The New Yorker staff writers
Pomona College alumni
City University of New York faculty
Graduate Center, CUNY faculty
National Humanities Medal recipients
Historians from California